Komagatani Sports Park Gymnasium is an arena in Sanda, Hyogo, Japan.

References

Basketball venues in Japan
Indoor arenas in Japan
Nishinomiya Storks
Sports venues in Hyōgo Prefecture
Sanda, Hyōgo